Jill R. Horwitz is Vice Dean of Faculty and Intellectual Life and David Sanders Professor of Law and Medicine at the UCLA School of Law and Associate Director of the Center for Law and Economics at UCLA.   Horwitz is also a research associate at the National Bureau of Economic Research, Reporter at the American Law Institute,  Adjunct Professor of Economics at the University of Victoria, Victoria, British Columbia of Canada,  and a member of the Board of Advisors of the New York University National Center on Philanthropy and the Law.

Education and training 

Horwitz graduated from Northwestern University, with a B.A. in History with honors.  She holds a J.D. magna cum laude, Master in Public Policy, and Ph.D. in Health Policy from Harvard University. She was a Law Clerk for Judge Norman H. Stahl of the United States Court of Appeals for the First Circuit (1997–1998).

Career 

Horwitz joined the faculty of the University of Michigan Law School in 2003. While there, she was the Co-Director of the Program in Law and Economics and the Louis and Myrtle Moskowitz Research Professor of Business and Law. She also held appointments at the University of Michigan School of Public Health and the Gerald R. Ford School of Public Policy.  She has been a member of the Core Faculties of both the Robert Wood Johnson Clinical and Policy Scholars programs at Michigan.

Horwitz has written extensively on the interconnections among health regulation, economics, and policy. She has published on topics ranging from the effects of nonprofit and for-profit ownership of hospitals on medical service provision to medical technology diffusion to opioid regulation, and has frequently commented on these topics in editorials,  testimony to Congress, and the press.  Horwitz's recent publications include the article "Wellness Incentives In The Workplace: Cost Savings Through Cost Shifting To Unhealthy Workers," which has attracted considerable press and blog attention.  She is the Reporter on the American Law Institute Restatement of Charitable Nonprofit Organizations.

References 

UCLA School of Law faculty
Northwestern University alumni
Harvard Law School alumni
University of Michigan Law School faculty
Living people
Year of birth missing (living people)